Laksam–Chandpur line is a meter-gauge railway in Bangladesh operated by Bangladesh Railway. It extends from Laksam Junction Railway Station in Comilla District to Chandpur Railway Station in Chandpur District. It is maintained and operated by Bangladesh Eastern Railway.

Inauguration 
The Assam Bengal Railway Company, formed in England in 1892, took charge of the construction of railways in the country. Under this company, 150 km railway line from Chittagong to Comilla and 69 km meter-gauge railway line from Laksam to Chandpur were inaugurated on 1 July 1895.

List of stations 
From east to west:
 Laksham Junction railway station
 Chitoshi Road railway station
 Shahrasti railway station
 Meher railway station
 Waruk railway station
 Haziganj railway station
 Balakhal railway station
 Madhuroad railway station
 Shahtali railway station
 Maishadi Halt railway station
 Chandpur Court railway station
 Chandpur railway station

Rail service 
The following passenger trains run on the Laksam-Chandpur railway line:

 Chandpur Commuter
 Meghna Express
 Sagarika Express

Importance of double-line 
Chandpur-1 member of parliament and former Home Minister Mohiuddin Khan Alamgir said the Chandpur-Laksam railway double line needs to be built to boost trade and commerce. This will further expand trade and commerce with the region and with India and restore the glory of business in Chandpur.

References 

Metre gauge railways in Bangladesh